Renzo Cesana (30 October 1907, Rome – 8 November 1970, Hollywood, California) was an actor, writer, composer, and songwriter most famed for his title role on the American television show The Continental. He was also known as Renato Cesana.

Biography
Cesana was the grandson of Luigi Cesana, publisher of one of Rome's largest daily newspapers, Il Messaggero. He emigrated to  America as a screenwriter in 1929, to adapt Metro-Goldwyn-Mayer "talkies" for Italian audiences. After a failed attempt at becoming a film star, he appeared on radio in San Francisco, then became the U.S. advertising director for a prominent Italian wine, eventually opening his own advertising agency. He returned to Italy to co-write and appear in childhood friend Roberto Rossellini's film Stromboli (1950), then returned to America in 1949 to begin a film and television acting career in Hollywood.

In an era when advertisers and advertising agencies played major roles in program creation and sponsorship, Cesana created The Continental as a radio program that he produced, wrote, and starred in for a Los Angeles station in 1951, where it directly followed The Lonesome Gal, in which a female disk jockey talked soothingly to male listeners. After a brief and unsuccessful run, Cesana convinced a local television station to broadcast a video version of The Continental, which was picked up by the CBS television network in 1952.

The program led to a recording contract with Capitol Records, in which the non-singer Cesana would recite the lyrics of romantic songs to a musical accompaniment. For instance, "Walk The Lonesome Night" was a big hit in which Cesana recited the lyrics along with a piano and a theater organ. It was released on the "Ultra-Lounge Vol. 7: The Crime Scene" as an extra track; but it received massive success when it was originally released.

In 1967, he appeared in That Girl, as Dr. Cessna – an "ink blot" interpreting personality analyst. On September 20, 1967, Cesana appeared in Bewitched, "Business Italian Style" (Season 4, Episode 3). He played an entrepreneur hoping to have Tate & Stephens Advertising Agency introduce Chef Romani Italian Foods to the American market.

Filmography

Further reading
 "Renzo Cesana", Biography Index. Volume 2. New York: H.W. Wilson Co., 1953.
 "Renzo Cesana", The ASCAP Biographical Dictionary. Third edition. New York: American Society of Composers, Authors and Publishers, 1966.

References

External links
 "Latin Lover", Time magazine, 1951.
 .

1907 births
1970 deaths
Deaths from lung cancer in California
Italian male television actors
Italian emigrants to the United States
People of Lazian descent